Saud Alsanousi (born 27 May 1981) is a Kuwaiti novelist and journalist. His debut novel The Prisoner of Mirrors (2010) won the Leila Othman Prize. In 2011, his short story The Bonsai and the Old Man won a competition organized by Al-Arabi magazine and BBC Arabic. His novel The Bamboo Stalk, written from the perspective of a boy of mixed Kuwaiti-Filipino parentage about his struggle to find a place in either country, won the International Prize for Arabic Fiction (2013).

Saud Alsanousi lives in Kuwait and writes for the Al-Qabas newspaper.

Publications 
 Prisoner of Mirrors (2010)
 The Bonsai And The Old Man (2011)
 The Bamboo Stalk (2012)
 Grandma Hessa's Mice (2015)
 Hamam Al Dar (Pigeons of the House) (2017)
naqaat saleha (saleha’s camel) (2019)

References

External links
 Biography from the international literature festival Berlin

Kuwaiti novelists
Kuwaiti journalists
1981 births
Living people
International Prize for Arabic Fiction winners